Ceres is a comune (municipality) in the Metropolitan City of Turin in the Italian region Piedmont, located about  northwest of Turin.

Its train station is the terminus of the Turin–Ceres railway service.

Ceres borders the following municipalities: Groscavallo, Chialamberto, Cantoira, Monastero di Lanzo, Ala di Stura, Mezzenile, and Pessinetto.

References

Cities and towns in Piedmont